Beest may refer to:

Variant name of Beesd, a town in the Netherlands
A historical verb form in English, see

People with the surname
Hidde Van Beest (born 1979), Australian volleyball player
Pauline te Beest (born 1970), Dutch cricketer

See also
Beast (disambiguation)
Bees
Beet
Best (disambiguation)
Wildebeest